Kibuli Secondary School (KSS) is a mixed boarding junior (S1-S4) and senior (S5-S6) school in Uganda.

Location
KSS is located on Kibuli Hill, in Makindye Division, in the south-central part of the city of Kampala, Uganda's capital and largest city. The coordinates of Kibuli Secondary School are:0°18'38.0"N, 32°35'51.0"E (Latitude:0.310556; Longitude:32.597500).

Overview
The school is affiliated with the Muslim faith, but admission is based on academic performance and is open to any interested student, regardless of religious beliefs. The schools has a reputation of being a leading academic center with a history of sporting achievements.

History
The school was founded in 1959.

Notable alumni
The following are some of the prominent people who have gone through the school:
 Nancy Kacungira - Journalist, reporter and presenter at BBC on Focus on Africa and World Business Report
 Hakim Sendagire - Physician, microbiologist, biochemist and academic administrator. Current Dean, Habib Medical School
 John Ssebaana Kizito - Former Mayor of Kampala
 Moses Matovu, musician
 Henry Tumukunde - Former Director, Internal Security Organization (ISO)
 Muhammad Nsereko - Member of the Parliament of Uganda for Kampala Central.
 Ssekaana Musa - Justice of the High court of Uganda.  
 Moses Muhangi - President of Uganda Boxing Federation
 Sarah Kanyike - Cabinet Minister for the elderly and disabled, effective July 2020.

References

External links
 Kibuli Secondary School: General Information
 Fire Guts Kibuli Secondary School Dormitory 
 When Will New Katikkiro Visit Kibuli Mosque?

Mixed schools in Uganda
1959 establishments in Uganda
Makindye Division
Schools in Kampala